Brevibora exilis is a fish in the family Cyprinidae found in Sebangau and Kahayan basins in central Kalimantan,  Indonesia.

References 

Brevibora
Freshwater fish of Borneo
Fish described in 2014